Yasin, also known as Babayei-Yasin, is a tehsil of Gupis-Yasin District in the Gilgit-Baltistan region of Pakistan. It consists of several side-valleys, such as Center Yasin, Thaus, Nazbar, Morke, Thui, Sulatanabad, Sandi, Qorkulti, Gholjalti, Barkulti, Hundur, Umalsat, and Darkut.

See also
 Yasin Valley

Tehsils of Gilgit-Baltistan
Gupis-Yasin District